Ryabtsev or Rabtsaw is a Slavic masculine surname, its feminine counterpart is Ryabtseva or Rabtsaw. It may refer to
Anton Rabtsaw (born 1987), Belarusian football player
Dzmitry Rabtsaw (born 1991), Belarusian football player
Zhanna Ryabtseva (born 1977), Russian politician
Sergey Ryabtsev (born 1958), Russian musician
Vladislav Ryabtsev (born 1987), Russian rower